14 Squadron was a South African Air Force Squadron during the Second World War.  The Squadron was initially deployed to East Africa and was transferred to Egypt in April 1941 when hostilities ceased in East Africa.  It had been partially re-equipped with Marylands in early 1941 and was fully converted to these aircraft once in Egypt.  On arrival in Egypt, it was renamed 24 Squadron SAAF in order to prevent confusion with RAF No. 14 Squadron.

References

Squadrons of the South African Air Force
Military units and formations disestablished in 1941